Gary Aubert (born 13 August 1952) is a Canadian retired soccer player who earned one cap for the national team in 1973, scoring one goal in the process.

International career
Aubert made his debut for Canada in an August 1973 friendly match against Poland in which he immediately scored his first international goal. He also played in the unofficial match against Malta in September 1973.

External links

1952 births
Living people
Soccer players from Winnipeg
Association football forwards
Canadian soccer players
Canada men's international soccer players